Nicole Rachel "Nikki" Yanofsky (born February 8, 1994) is a Canadian jazz-pop singer from Montreal, Quebec. She sang the CTV Olympic broadcast theme song, "I Believe", which was also the theme song of the 2010 Winter Olympic Games. She also performed at the opening and closing ceremonies for the Olympics and at the opening ceremony of the 2010 Winter Paralympic Games. She has released four studio albums to date, including Nikki in 2010, Little Secret in 2014, Turn Down the Sound in 2020, and Nikki By Starlight in 2022.

Early life
Yanofsky was born and raised in a "close-knit Jewish family" in Montreal, Quebec, Canada. Her parents are Elyssa (née Rosenthal) and Richard Yanofsky. She has two older brothers, Michael and Andrew.

Yanofsky graduated from St. George's School of Montreal.

Recordings
Yanofsky recorded the Ella Fitzgerald song "Air Mail Special" for Verve Records and it was released in June 2007 on the album We All Love Ella: Celebrating the First Lady of Song. Produced by Tommy LiPuma, this track made Yanofsky the youngest singer to record for Verve. She then recorded "Gotta Go My Own Way" in English and French for the movie High School Musical 2.

She collaborated with Herbie Hancock and will.i.am on a crossover version of the swing era hit "Stompin' at the Savoy". It was released on Kareem Abdul-Jabbar's audio book, On the Shoulders of Giants.

In September 2008, Yanofsky released her first full-length album, a live CD/DVD concert package entitled Ella...Of Thee I Swing. She earned two Juno Award nominations in 2009: New Artist of the Year and Vocal Jazz Album of the Year. She also won Favourite Jazz Artist at the 2009 Canadian Independent Music Awards.

In 2009, Yanofsky calborated with Wyclef Jean and the cast of The Electric Company for a song titled "Electric City," and was part of the music video.

Songwriters Stephan Moccio and Alan Frew chose Yanofsky to sing CTV's broadcast theme for the 2010 Winter Olympics, "I Believe", which reached number one on the Canadian Hot 100 on the week of February 27, 2010. This made her the first Canadian artist to have a number one song on that chart. The song was certified "Quadruple Platinum" for digital downloads in April 2010.

In 2010, Yanofsky recorded her first studio album, Nikki, with Phil Ramone. Along with the album-release of "I Believe", it included some of Yanofsky's first original works, collaborating with Jesse Harris, Ron Sexsmith and Feist. Nikki was released in April 2010 by Decca Records and was supported by an international tour. It earned a Juno nomination for "Vocal Jazz Album of the Year" and won Yanofsky the WAVE Smooth Jazz Award for "Female Vocalist of the Year".

For Ganz's October 2010 Webkinz Pet of the Month song, Yanofsky recorded a version of the Webkinz World song "I Dream in Pink".

Yanofsky was No. 19 on Billboard.com's 2010 list of the top stars under 21 years old and #1 on the Billboard Heatseekers Chart.

A 2011 jazz recording of popular Disney songs entitled Everybody Wants to Be a Cat: Disney Jazz, Volume 1 included a version of the song "It's a Small World" sung by Yanofsky. Other jazz artists on the album included Esperanza Spalding, Roy Hargrove, Dave Brubeck, Joshua Redman, and Alfredo Rodriguez.

In September 2011, Yanofsky performed at the Hollywood Bowl with Quincy Jones and was a part of his Global Gumbo All Star band.

Yanofsky's second studio album, Little Secret, was released in Canada in May 2014. The album was executive produced by Quincy Jones. and was nominated for two Juno awards.

In February 2015, Yanofsky released a collaborative track with English producer and artist Jacob Collier titled "One Day".

In 2015 Yanofsky began collaborating with Wyclef Jean on her new album and EP. Her Solid Gold EP was released in Canada on September 30, 2016.

In August 2018, Nikki Yanofsky started teasing on her Instagram for an upcoming music video. Nikki Yanofsky has worked with Herbie Hancock, Will.i.am, Elton John and now working with her favourite artist and mentor Quincy Jones. "Big Mouth" was released on September 14, 2018.

On July 10, 2020, Yanofsky released her third studio album Turn Down the Sound, co-written with Rod Temperton. It also includes “Bubbles” written by Rod Temperton (Thriller, Off The Wall, Rock With You, Always & Forever, Boogie Nights, Grooveline).

Yanofsky co-produced Nikki By Starlight in October 2022 with the JUNO-winning producer/composer Paul Shrofel. It features contributions from Greg Phillinganes, Nathan East (Bobby Womack, Herbie Hancock, Michael Jackson) and the Cuban-American jazz trumpeter Arturo Sandoval. In January 2023, the album was nominated for a JUNO award in the "Vocal Jazz Album of the Year" category.

Stage

Yanofsky began her professional singing career by performing at the 2006 Montreal International Jazz Festival. Only 12 at the time, this performance made her the youngest performer ever to headline at the festival. She has returned each year since, including a special outdoor performance for the festival's 30th Anniversary in 2009 and a performance with l'Orchestre Métropolitain in 2011. Her other Canadian festival performances include Toronto (Luminato and Downtown), Ottawa (Jazz and Blues), Vancouver, Victoria, Quebec, Edmonton, Saskatoon, and Fredericton. Her international festival appearances include two visits to The Jamaica Jazz and Blues Festival, several European festivals including the North Sea Jazz Festival and the Montreux Jazz Festival as well as the Ginza International Jazz Festival in Japan at Kabuki-za.

On February 8, 2008, Yanofsky's 14th birthday, she kicked off a multi-city tour with Marvin Hamlisch at Carnegie Hall. In November 2008, she made her Canadian orchestral debut with the Edmonton Symphony Orchestra, and has gone on to sing with the Vancouver Symphony, the Edmonton Symphony and the Calgary Philharmonic.

With Herbie Hancock on piano, Yanofsky sang "On A Clear Day You Can See Forever" at the 2011 MusiCares Person of the Year awards honouring Barbra Streisand.

On April 13, 2013, Yanofsky and Stevie Wonder sang "Let the Good Times Roll" at the MGM Grand Garden Arena in Las Vegas. The event honoured the joint 80th birthday celebration of Quincy Jones and Sir Michael Caine.

Her performance on Dancing With The Stars was featured in the New York Times.

The Little Secret Tour began on June 21, 2013, promoting Yanofsky's album, Little Secret.

Charitable works
In 2008, Yanofsky received the Outstanding Youth in Philanthropy award from the Quebec Chapter of The Association of Fundraising Professionals. In the course of her career, she has helped raise over $10 million for local, national and international charities. She is currently associated with The Montreal Children's Hospital, The Children's Wish Foundation, and MusiCounts. She has also lent her voice to oneXone, Leave Out Violence Everywhere (L.O.V.E.), and ORT.

Yanofsky sang a solo part in the remake of K'naan's song "Wavin' Flag" performed by Young Artists for Haiti. This song was certified platinum for digital downloads in April 2010, and all of the proceeds from the single went to charities.

In October 2010, Yanofsky was awarded the first ever Allan Slaight Award by Canada's Walk of Fame. This award is presented annually to a young Canadian who is making a positive impact in the fields of music, film, literature, visual or performing arts, sports, innovation or philanthropy.

Discography

Albums

EPs 
 Solid Gold EP (September 2016)

Singles

Videography

DVDs

Awards and nominations

Notes

References

External links

1994 births
Living people
Anglophone Quebec people
Canadian child singers
Canadian women jazz singers
People from Hampstead, Quebec
Singers from Montreal
Canadian women pop singers
21st-century Canadian women singers
Jewish Canadian musicians
Jazz-pop singers